Swimming at the 2015 Pacific Games was held in Port Moresby, Papua New Guinea on 6–12 July 2015. The women's events were dominated by New Caledonia's Lara Grangeon who won eight individual gold medals and was a team member in four gold medal-winning relays. Papua New Guinea's Ryan Pini won six individual gold medals in the men's events and was a team member in the gold medal-winning mixed 4×50 metre medley relay.

Event schedule
The forty events in the pool, nineteen each for men and women plus two mixed relays, were spread over six days at the Taurama Pool, with heats held in the morning sessions, followed by the finals in the evenings.

The men's and women's open water race events were scheduled for Sunday, July 12 at the Loloata Resort.

Medal summary

Medal table

Men's

Women's

Mixed

Notes

References

Sources

2015 Pacific Games
2015
Pacific Games